PVR Ltd (formerly Priya Village Roadshow Ltd), doing business as PVR Cinemas, is an Indian multiplex chain based in Gurgaon. PVR pioneered the multiplex revolution in India by establishing the first multiplex cinema in 1997 at Saket, New Delhi.

History

PVR Cinemas has its origin as Priya Cinema in Vasant Vihar, Delhi, the Cinema was named after Priya Jaisinghani and was bought by Ajay Bijli's father in 1978, who also owned a trucking business, Amritsar Transport Co. In 1988, Bijli took over the running of the cinema hall, which was revamped in 1990, and its success led to the founding PVR Cinemas.

The company started as a joint venture agreement between Priya Exhibitors Private Limited and Village Roadshow Limited in 1995 with 60:40 ratio. It began its commercial operations in June 1997. The company is founded by Ajay Bijli who is the chairman and managing director of PVR Cinemas. Ajay Bijli's brother Sanjeev Kumar Bijli is the Joint Managing Director of PVR Ltd. The company also operates a pro-active CSR wing under PVR. The first PVR Gold Screen was introduced in Forum Mall, Bengaluru.

Mergers and acquisitions 
In 2003, ICICI Ventures invested 40 crore in PVR when Village Roadshow decided to pull out of the partnership.

In August 2018, PVR Cinemas announced their acquisition of Chennai-based SPI Cinemas for ₹850 crore in a cash and stock deal.

In August 2019, PVR Cinemas crossed the 800 screens milestone in India.

On 27 March 2022, PVR announced it would be merging with INOX Leisure, the second largest cinema chain in India.

Collaborations 
In October 2021, PVR announced their collaboration with the film RRR as part of the film's promotion. Accordingly, PVR would rebrand itself as PVRRR across the multiplex chain's 170+ properties in over 70 cities for a few months following the film's release on 25 March 2022.

In June 2022, PVR announced a collaboration with French high-end theatre company, Ice Theatres, part of CGR Theatres, to open new premium theatres in India.

Formats

PVR Gold Screen 
PVR's first "Gold Screen" was launched in Indore in 2007.

PVR Superplex 
In 2014, PVR Cinemas introduced Superplex format in Noida. The cinema has 15 screens with IMAX, 4DX, Gold Class, a playhouse and mainstream auditoriums. PVR Cinemas has invested ₹48 crores in this new venture. PVR also joined hands with friends group and business venture was called FRIENDS CINEMA

PVR Playhouse 
PVR Playhouse includes a special movie auditorium showcasing children's movies/animated content. Along with a slide to play on, it offers bean bags and rubberised seats kids and parents. This format is available only in Bengaluru, Chennai, Delhi,  Mumbai, Indore and Hyderabad.

PVR 4DX 
In 2016, PVR's 4DX became the second movie theater chain in India to introduce 4DX in the country after Cinépolis.

Gallery

References

External links 
 PVR Cinemas official website

Cinema chains in India
Companies based in Gurgaon
Entertainment companies established in 1997
1997 establishments in Haryana
Warburg Pincus companies
Companies listed on the National Stock Exchange of India
Companies listed on the Bombay Stock Exchange